The Mecidiye Marşı was the national anthem of the Ottoman Empire during the reign of Abdülmecid I (2 July 1839 – 25 June 1861). There were different anthems for each sultan. Franz Liszt visited the imperial capital and composed a paraphrase to this march named Op. 87 Grande Paraphrase de la Marche de J. Donizetti. Donizetti had another march, Büyük Askerî Marş, also known as Grande March de Medjidie, composed for Abdülmecid I during the same period. Donizetti mentions Liszt as enjoying the two imperial marches and obtaining the sheet music from him to play them as variations.

See also
 Imperial anthems of the Ottoman Empire

References

External links
Music Sheet

Ottoman culture
Historical national anthems
Asian anthems
European anthems
Royal anthems
Abdulmejid I